Muhammad Inuwa Yahaya (born 9 October 1961) is a Nigerian businessman and politician who has served as the governor of Gombe State since 2019.

Early life
Muhammad Inuwa Yahaya was born on 9 October 1961 in Jekadefari, Gombe State. His father, Alhaji Yahaya Umaru, was a  famous businessman.

Education
Yahaya attended the Central Primary School and the Government Science Secondary School in Gombe. He then studied at Ahmadu Bello University, Zaria, where he obtained a Bachelor of Science degree in Accounting in 1983.

Career
Yahaya has worked in both the public and the private sector. He started his working career with the Bauchi State Investment and Property Development Company, where he was a principal accountant from 1984 to 1985. He was a managing director of A.Y.U Civil Engineering Company Ltd from 1993 to 1999.

In 2003, he was appointed as Commissioner for Finance and Economic Development by Governor Muhammed Danjuma Goje.

Professional associations 
Yahaya is a member of the following professional bodies:

 Association of Nation Accountants of Nigeria (ANAN), 
 Nigeria Institute of Management (NIM) 
 Chartered Institution of Taxation of Nigeria (ACITN)

Politics
Yahaya joined politics in 2003. In the governorship election in 2015, He was the flag bearer of the All Progressives Congress (APC) in Gombe State. On 1 October 2018, he won the Gombe State gubernatorial All Progressives Congress primary election with the highest votes with 859 votes to beat his closest rival, Mohammed Jibrin Barde who polled 463 votes.

On 9 March 2019, Yahaya was declared governor-elect of Gombe State at the 2019 Gombe State gubernatorial election. He scored a total number of 364,179 votes to defeat his closest rival of the Peoples Democratic Party (PDP), Sen. Usman Bayero Nafada, who polled 222,868 votes.

Personal life
He is married to two wives and has seven children all residing in Gombe. His first son has married in 2022.

See also
Gombe State
List of Governors of Gombe State

References

1961 births
Living people
Nigerian Muslims
Governors of Gombe State
People from Gombe State
Ahmadu Bello University alumni
All Progressives Congress politicians